John Joseph Pyeatt (September 16, 1933 – April 23, 2020) was an American football player who played for Denver Broncos of the American Football League (AFL) from 1960 to 1961.

He died of cancer on April 23, 2020, in Florence, Arizona at age 86.

References

1933 births
2020 deaths
Denver Broncos (AFL) players
American football defensive backs